Vier Noorder Koggen, also known as Hoogwouder, is a former amt and water board in the Netherlands, in the province of North Holland. The most important town within it was Medemblik.

Populated places in North Holland
Populated places in Friesland